= Topple rate =

Measure of how often market leaders lose leadership

Topple rate is measure of how often the leading companies in a particular industry changes. It is defined as the probability that a firm in the industry, already in the top 20% in revenue, will drop out of this revenue leadership position within the next five years. The topple rate is one method of measuring overall competition in a particular industry; higher topple rates are often viewed as indicating a strong market with healthy economic activity. The term's invention is credited to McKinsey consultant Patrick Viguerie.

Modern industries have increasingly taken advantage of advances in technology and globalization to drive significant increases in productivity, but these changes also more easily enable new competitors and new innovations. These competitors often have lower costs, lower return requirements, or cheaper or imitation products. Topple rates across all industries doubled between 1972 and 2002, even when controlling for acquisitions of previous industry leaders; including them in the data showed that the overall rate actually tripled. At the peak of the Great Depression in 1937, companies listed on the S&P 500 had an average lifespan of 75 years. By 2011, that figure had fallen to 18 years, a reduction in lifespan of 76%.

In 2011, a study by Deloitte of 20,000 firms from 1965 to 2010 showed an overall doubling of the topple rate, though the effect occurred at different speeds across various industries. Those least affected by the increase in topple rate tended to be those more heavily regulated, such as aerospace, health care, and defense. However, rapid change can occur even in these industries if there are fundamental shifts in regulations or other disruptive forces.
